The 1940–41 New York Rangers season was the franchise's 15th season. During the regular season, the Rangers finished in fourth place in the NHL with 50 points and qualified for the playoffs. In the first round of the playoffs, New York lost to the Detroit Red Wings, two games to one.

Regular season

Final standings

Record vs. opponents

Schedule and results

|- align="center" bgcolor="#CCFFCC"
| 1 || 2 || @ Toronto Maple Leafs || 4–1 || 1–0–0
|- align="center" bgcolor="white"
| 2 || 10 || @ Detroit Red Wings || 2 – 2 OT || 1–0–1
|- align="center" bgcolor="white"
| 3 || 16 || Detroit Red Wings || 3 – 3 OT || 1–0–2
|- align="center" bgcolor="#CCFFCC"
| 4 || 19 || New York Americans || 3–2 || 2–0–2
|- align="center" bgcolor="#FFBBBB"
| 5 || 23 || Boston Bruins || 2–1 || 2–1–2
|- align="center" bgcolor="#FFBBBB"
| 6 || 26 || Toronto Maple Leafs || 4–2 || 2–2–2
|- align="center" bgcolor="#FFBBBB"
| 7 || 28 || @ New York Americans || 2–1 || 2–3–2
|- align="center" bgcolor="#CCFFCC"
| 8 || 30 || Montreal Canadiens || 6–1 || 3–3–2
|-

|- align="center" bgcolor="#FFBBBB"
| 9 || 1 || @ Chicago Black Hawks || 4–1 || 3–4–2
|- align="center" bgcolor="#CCFFCC"
| 10 || 5 || @ Montreal Canadiens || 3–2 || 4–4–2
|- align="center" bgcolor="#FFBBBB"
| 11 || 8 || Detroit Red Wings || 3–1 || 4–5–2
|- align="center" bgcolor="#FFBBBB"
| 12 || 10 || @ Boston Bruins || 6–2 || 4–6–2
|- align="center" bgcolor="#FFBBBB"
| 13 || 13 || @ Detroit Red Wings || 3 – 2 OT || 4–7–2
|- align="center" bgcolor="#CCFFCC"
| 14 || 15 || New York Americans || 6–3 || 5–7–2
|- align="center" bgcolor="#CCFFCC"
| 15 || 19 || Boston Bruins || 5–3 || 6–7–2
|- align="center" bgcolor="#FFBBBB"
| 16 || 22 || @ Chicago Black Hawks || 3 – 1 OT || 6–8–2
|- align="center" bgcolor="white"
| 17 || 25 || Chicago Black Hawks || 3 – 3 OT || 6–8–3
|- align="center" bgcolor="#FFBBBB"
| 18 || 28 || @ Toronto Maple Leafs || 3–2 || 6–9–3
|- align="center" bgcolor="#CCFFCC"
| 19 || 29 || Toronto Maple Leafs || 3–2 || 7–9–3
|- align="center" bgcolor="white"
| 20 || 31 || @ Boston Bruins || 2 – 2 OT || 7–9–4
|-

|- align="center" bgcolor="#FFBBBB"
| 21 || 1 || Montreal Canadiens || 2–1 || 7–10–4
|- align="center" bgcolor="white"
| 22 || 4 || @ Montreal Canadiens || 3 – 3 OT || 7–10–5
|- align="center" bgcolor="#CCFFCC"
| 23 || 5 || @ New York Americans || 6–2 || 8–10–5
|- align="center" bgcolor="#FFBBBB"
| 24 || 7 || Chicago Black Hawks || 3–2 || 8–11–5
|- align="center" bgcolor="#FFBBBB"
| 25 || 9 || @ Toronto Maple Leafs || 3 – 2 OT || 8–12–5
|- align="center" bgcolor="#CCFFCC"
| 26 || 12 || New York Americans || 3–1 || 9–12–5
|- align="center" bgcolor="white"
| 27 || 14 || Detroit Red Wings || 3 – 3 OT || 9–12–6
|- align="center" bgcolor="white"
| 28 || 16 || Boston Bruins || 2 – 2 OT || 9–12–7
|- align="center" bgcolor="#CCFFCC"
| 29 || 19 || @ Detroit Red Wings || 2–1 || 10–12–7
|- align="center" bgcolor="#FFBBBB"
| 30 || 21 || @ Boston Bruins || 4 – 3 OT || 10–13–7
|- align="center" bgcolor="#FFBBBB"
| 31 || 26 || @ Chicago Black Hawks || 4–1 || 10–14–7
|-

|- align="center" bgcolor="#CCFFCC"
| 32 || 2 || Montreal Canadiens || 2–1 || 11–14–7
|- align="center" bgcolor="white"
| 33 || 4 || @ New York Americans || 2 – 2 OT || 11–14–8
|- align="center" bgcolor="#CCFFCC"
| 34 || 6 || Chicago Black Hawks || 6–2 || 12–14–8
|- align="center" bgcolor="#CCFFCC"
| 35 || 9 || @ Chicago Black Hawks || 2–1 || 13–14–8
|- align="center" bgcolor="#FFBBBB"
| 36 || 11 || @ Montreal Canadiens || 6–2 || 13–15–8
|- align="center" bgcolor="#FFBBBB"
| 37 || 13 || Boston Bruins || 5–3 || 13–16–8
|- align="center" bgcolor="#FFBBBB"
| 38 || 15 || @ Toronto Maple Leafs || 4–3 || 13–17–8
|- align="center" bgcolor="#FFBBBB"
| 39 || 16 || Toronto Maple Leafs || 4–1 || 13–18–8
|- align="center" bgcolor="#CCFFCC"
| 40 || 18 || @ New York Americans || 5–2 || 14–18–8
|- align="center" bgcolor="#CCFFCC"
| 41 || 23 || Chicago Black Hawks || 4–1 || 15–18–8
|- align="center" bgcolor="#CCFFCC"
| 42 || 25 || @ Boston Bruins || 2–0 || 16–18–8
|- align="center" bgcolor="#CCFFCC"
| 43 || 27 || Montreal Canadiens || 5–2 || 17–18–8
|-

|- align="center" bgcolor="#CCFFCC"
| 44 || 1 || @ Montreal Canadiens || 3–1 || 18–18–8
|- align="center" bgcolor="#FFBBBB"
| 45 || 2 || @ Detroit Red Wings || 4 – 2 OT || 18–19–8
|- align="center" bgcolor="#CCFFCC"
| 46 || 4 || Detroit Red Wings || 6–0 || 19–19–8
|- align="center" bgcolor="#CCFFCC"
| 47 || 9 || Toronto Maple Leafs || 8–5 || 20–19–8
|- align="center" bgcolor="#CCFFCC"
| 48 || 16 || New York Americans || 6–3 || 21–19–8
|-

Playoffs

Key:  Win  Loss

Player statistics
Skaters

Goaltenders

†Denotes player spent time with another team before joining Rangers. Stats reflect time with Rangers only.
‡Traded mid-season. Stats reflect time with Rangers only.

See also 
 1940–41 NHL season

References 

New York Rangers seasons
New York Rangers
New York Rangers
New York Rangers
New York Rangers
Madison Square Garden
1940s in Manhattan